Anna-Karin Svensson (born 8 May 1974) is a former professional tennis player from Sweden.

Biography
Svensson played on the professional tour in the 1990s, with a best ranking in singles of 280 in the world. As a doubles player she had a breakthrough year in 1996 when she won seven ITF titles, to reach a career high ranking of 160.

Across 1996 and 1997 she featured in eight Fed Cup ties for Sweden. In Fed Cup play she had a 4/4 record in singles and won both of her two doubles matches.

ITF finals

Singles (1–3)

Doubles (14–10)

See also
 List of Sweden Fed Cup team representatives

References

External links
 
 
 

1974 births
Living people
Swedish female tennis players
20th-century Swedish women
21st-century Swedish women